Pandit Shivnath Mishra (born 12 October 1943) is an Indian sitarist. He is an exponent of the Benares Gharana school of Indian classical music. He was formerly a lecturer and the Head of the Music Department at the Sampurnanand Sanskrit University, Varanasi.

Early life

Shivnath Mishra was born in 1943 in Benares, United Provinces, British India into a family of professional musicians. He is the 10th generation of the prominent Benares Gharana lineage. He studied under his father, Badri Prasad Mishra and uncle Mahadev Prasad Mishra. However, when he was eight his musical inclination led him to study the sitar.

Musical career

In 1967, Mishra won the prestigious All India Radio competition held at Allahabad. This was followed by a gold medal at the All India Music Conference in Calcutta in 1967. Mishra has played at several prestigious music festivals including Sangeet Natak Academy in 1993. He has played many times in Ganga Mahotsav Cultural Program organized by the Government of Uttar Pradesh. He is a prominent 'A' class Artist in All India Radio.

Shivnath Mishra, his son Deobrat, and various other members of the Mishra-Maharaj family were featured in the 2011 British ITV1 documentary A Passage Through India, narrated by Caroline Quentin.

Mishra has toured extensively internationally including to Italy, Germany, Frace, Belgium, Holland, Japan, Switzerlad, Austria, Norway, Sweden, Denmark, Canada and the US.

Mr. Mishra is known for supporting social movements through his music. He has organized several charity events to support social organizations. In January 2009 he organized a concert at his own academy in Varanasi as a tribute to the victims of 2008 Mumbai attacks. On 12 June 2012 Mr. Mishra organized another huge event to support Ganga Seva Abhiyanam's fight to protect the purity and sanctity of the river Ganges.

Discography

 Sound of Sitar
 Soul of Sitar
 Sitar Jugalbandi: Live in Milan
 Raag Desh: Monsoon Raga (2002)
 Joy (2003)
 Raga Cycle (2004)
 Rare Instruments: Surbahar - Pandit Shivnath & Deobrat Mihsra (ASA Music)

Awards and accolades
 Shivnath Mishra was awarded the title of Padma Shri in 2022. He is the only Sitar player from Varanasi to have received Padma Shri Award after Ravi Shankar
 Shivnath Mishra was awarded the UP Sangeet Natak Academy Award in 2004.
https://en.wikipedia.org/wiki/Uttar_Pradesh_Sangeet_Natak_Akademi_Award

References

External links

Indian male composers
Sitar players
1943 births
Living people
Musicians from Varanasi
Hindustani composers
20th-century Indian composers
Indian music educators
20th-century male musicians